José Juan Figueiras García (born 25 January 1979), known as José Juan, is a Spanish professional footballer who plays as a goalkeeper for Athletic Club Torrellano.

Club career
Born in Vigo, Province of Pontevedra, Galicia, José Juan played one match in La Liga with RC Celta de Vigo in the 2002–03 season, which consisted of 37 minutes in a 2–2 home draw against Racing de Santander after coming on as a substitute for Pablo Cavallero, who was sent off (he replaced field player José Ignacio de facto).

After having joined Ciudad de Murcia in January 2005, José Juan spent three and a half years with the Segunda División club – renamed Granada 74 CF in 2007 – and had a lengthy spell in the Segunda División B, with stints at CD Ourense (two), Celta de Vigo B and Granada CF. He won the Ricardo Zamora Trophy in the 2004–05 campaign whilst at Ourense.

In August 2012, after two consecutive promotions at Granada (losing his place after the first), José Juan signed for second division team CD Lugo of his native region. After five seasons of regular football, playing 135 games in all, he dropped down a tier to join Elche CF, who won promotion in the 2017–18 campaign with a play-off win over Villarreal CF B.

On 27 June 2019, free agent José Juan signed a one-year contract with Tercera División club CD Alcoyano, aged 40. He contributed 29 appearances in his first season, play-offs included, in a promotion.

José Juan put on a Player of the match performance in a Copa del Rey match against Real Madrid on 20 January 2021, a 2–1 victory in the round of 32. On 14 December that year, in the second round of the next tournament, he saved two penalties in the 3–1 shootout defeat of top-flight Levante UD.

References

External links

1979 births
Living people
Spanish footballers
Footballers from Vigo
Association football goalkeepers
La Liga players
Segunda División players
Segunda División B players
Tercera División players
Primera Federación players
Tercera Federación players
Real Valladolid Promesas players
CD Ourense footballers
Celta de Vigo B players
RC Celta de Vigo players
Ciudad de Murcia footballers
Granada 74 CF footballers
Águilas CF players
Granada CF footballers
CD Lugo players
Elche CF players
CD Alcoyano footballers